Murino is a village in the municipality of Plav, Montenegro.

Demographics
According to the 2011 census, its population was 462.

History

Murino was bombed by NATO aviation forces as part of the bombing campaign against the SR Yugoslavia. The NATO forces killed six civilians, including three children. Forty people were seriously injured.

References

Populated places in Plav Municipality
Serb communities in Montenegro